Dachimawa Lee (lit. "Dajjimawa Lee: Bye, Villain! Take the Express Train to Hell") is a 2008 South Korean film. It has been released via online streaming in the United States with the title Dachimawa Lee: Gangnam Spy.

Plot 
The legendary Korean spy Dachimawa Lee is assigned to recover the fabled Golden Buddha statue, but his mission ends in failure. Lee discovers that his mission was sabotaged, and must confront against the shadowy figure behind the plot.

Cast 
 Im Won-hee ... Dachimawa Lee
 Gong Hyo-jin ... Keum Yeon-ja
 Park Si-yeon ... Ma-ri
 Hwang Bo-ra ... Weird girl
 Kim Byeong-ok ... Mr. Wang
 Kim Su-hyeon ... Dama Ne-gi
 Ahn Gil-kang ... Jin-sang 6
 Ryoo Seung-bum ... National border wildcat
 Oh Ji-hye ... Madame Jang
 Jo Deok-hyeon ... Hoo Gga-shi
 Lee Jeong-heon ... Ya-shi
 Gary (cameo)
 Gil Seong-joon (cameo)
 Kim Roi-ha ... General Kim

Release 
Dachimawa Lee was released in South Korea on August 13, 2008, and was ranked fourth at the box office in its opening weekend with 233,251 admissions.

References

External links 
  
 
 
 

2008 films
2000s action comedy films
South Korean action comedy films
2000s spy comedy films
Films set in the 1940s
Films set in Jilin
Films shot in Incheon
Features based on short films
Films directed by Ryoo Seung-wan
2000s Korean-language films
2000s Mandarin-language films
Showbox films
Films set in Korea under Japanese rule
2008 comedy films
2000s South Korean films